Zombie is a 2019 Indian Tamil-language zombie comedy film produced by Vasanth Mahalingam and V. Muthukumar under their production banner S3 Pictures. The film is written and directed by Bhuvan Nullan. Yogi Babu and Yashika Aannand have featured in the lead roles, while Manobala, Gopi, Sudhakar and Anbu Dasan have played pivotal roles. Premgi Amaren has composed the music for the film. This film received highly negative reviews from audiences and critics.

Plot 

This story revolves around friends who plan to go on vacation after getting tired of their day-to-day lives. Meanwhile, when they try to escape from that boring hectic life they get attacked by zombies on their vacation and struggle a lot to save their lives and in this hush they meet Aishwarya (Yashika Aannand).

Cast 

 Yogi Babu as Gangster Pistol Raj
 Yashika Aannand as Aishwarya
 Black Sheep Anbu as Gautham
 Gopi (Parithabangal) as Singh (Singaravelan)
 Sudhakar (Parithabangal) as Chinna Thambi
 Bijili Ramesh as Petta Philips
 T. M. Karthik as MSD
 John Vijay as Inspector Panner Selvam
 Manobala as Chinna Thambi's Father in law
 TikTok Chitra Kajal as Yashika's Professor
 Dhuniya Sudhakar
Lokesh Pop as Don's assistant
Kutty Gopi
 Aishwarya Palani
 Elakkiya as the bride for Gautham
Lollu Sabha Manohar
Yaanai Joke Kathir as hacker
Premgi Amaren (special appearance in "Are You Okay Baby")
 Shanaya Daphne Alicia Neha

Production 
The film wrapped up shoot in the first week of March 2019. The film is like Miruthan by Jayam Ravi whereas Miruthan is a zombie-thriller film but this film is a comedy-zombie film.

Soundtrack

Marketing and release 
The official teaser of the film was unveiled on 7 June 2019. The official trailer of the film was unveiled by Lahari Music and T-Series on 21 August 2019.

The film was released theatrically on 6 September 2019.

References

External links 
 

2019 films
2019 comedy horror films
2010s adventure comedy films
2010s Tamil-language films
Indian adventure comedy films
Indian zombie films
Zombie comedy films
Indian comedy horror films
Films scored by Premgi Amaren